The 2012 Silverstone GP3 Series round was a GP3 Series motor race held on 7 and 8 July 2012 at Silverstone Circuit in Silverstone, United Kingdom. It was the fourth round of the 2012 GP3 Season. The race supported the 2012 British Grand Prix.

Trident Racing entered a third car for Giovanni Venturini in the GP3 category, making the Silverstone rounds the first time the GP3 Series had been run with a full twenty-seven car grid in 2012.

Classification

Qualifying

Notes:
 — David Fumanelli and Alice Powell were both given two place grid penalties for taking the chequered flag twice at the end of the Qualifying session.
 — Tamás Pál Kiss wash given a ten-place grid penalty for ignoring yellow flags during the first practice session.
 — Ethan Ringel was given a ten-place grid penalty for ignoring yellow flags during the first practice session. He later received a two-place grid penalty for taking the chequered flag twice at the end of qualifying. As Ringel qualified twenty-sixth of the twenty-six drivers to set a lap time, and so started the feature race from the back of the grid.
 — Carmen Jordá was given a two-place grid penalty for taking the chequered flag twice at the end of qualifying. However, as she did not set a lap time within 107% of Mitch Evans' pole position time, she was not given permission to start the race.

Race 1

Race 2

Notes:
 — Robert Visoiu finished Race 1 in twelfth position, but received a three-place grid penalty for crossing the finish line twice at the end of the race, and so started Race 2 from fifteenth position.

Standings after the round

Drivers' Championship standings

Teams' Championship standings

 Note: Only the top five positions are included for both sets of standings.

See also 
 2012 British Grand Prix
 2012 Silverstone GP2 Series round

References

Silverstone
Silverstone